Maksim Aleksandrovich Osipenko (born 16 May 1994) is a Russian football defender. He plays as a centre-back for FC Rostov and the Russia national team.

Club career
Osipenko made his debut in the Russian Second Division for FC Irtysh Omsk on 6 August 2013 in a game against FC Baikal Irkutsk.

On 19 June 2019, Osipenko signed a one-year contract with one-year extension option with Russian Premier League club FC Tambov. He made his debut in the Russian Premier League for Tambov on 14 July 2019 in a game against FC Zenit Saint Petersburg.

On 9 January 2020 he signed a 4.5-year contract with FC Rostov. On 6 December 2022, Osipenko extended his contract with Rostov until the end of the 2026–27 season.

International career
He was called up to the Russia national football team for the first time for World Cup qualifiers against Croatia, Cyprus and Malta in September 2021. He made his debut on 7 September 2021 against Malta, starting and playing the whole game in a 2–0 home victory.

Career statistics

Club

International

References

External links

1994 births
Sportspeople from Omsk
Living people
Russian people of Ukrainian descent
Russian footballers
Russia international footballers
Association football defenders
FC Irtysh Omsk players
FC Fakel Voronezh players
FC Tambov players
FC Rostov players
Russian Premier League players
Russian First League players
Russian Second League players